Alberto Palmetta (born 5 April 1990) is an Argentine boxer. He competed in the men's welterweight event at the 2016 Summer Olympics.

Professional boxing record

| style="text-align:center;" colspan="8"|4 wins (1 knockouts), 0 losses
|-  style="text-align:center; background:#e3e3e3;"
|  style="border-style:none none solid solid; "|Res.
|  style="border-style:none none solid solid; "|Record
|  style="border-style:none none solid solid; "|Opponent
|  style="border-style:none none solid solid; "|Type
|  style="border-style:none none solid solid; "|Rd., Time
|  style="border-style:none none solid solid; "|Date
|  style="border-style:none none solid solid; "|Location
|  style="border-style:none none solid solid; "|Notes
|- align=center
|Win
|5-0
|align=left| Oscar Alberto Paz
|
|
|
|align=left|
|align=left|
|- align=center
|Win
|4-0
|align=left| Octavio Ezequiel Segundo
|
|
|
|align=left|
|align=left|
|- align=center
|Win
|3-0
|align=left| Luis Montelongo
|
|
|
|align=left|
|align=left|
|- align=center
|Win
|2-0
|align=left| Nicolas Luques Palacios
|
|
|
|align=left|
|align=left|
|- align=center
|Win
|1-0
|align=left| Alfredo Gaston Benavidez
|
|
|
|align=left|
|align=left|
|- align=center

References

External links
 

1990 births
Living people
Argentine male boxers
Pan American Games bronze medalists for Argentina
Boxers at the 2015 Pan American Games
Olympic boxers of Argentina
Boxers at the 2016 Summer Olympics
Place of birth missing (living people)
Pan American Games medalists in boxing
Welterweight boxers
Medalists at the 2015 Pan American Games